David Carlyle (born 1 June 1988) is a British actor from Scotland. Following a 10 year stage career, Carlyle starred in the multi-award winning 2021 Channel 4 / HBO Max Series It’s a Sin which led to his nomination as Best Supporting Actor in the 2022 British Academy Television Awards (BAFTA) and BAFTA Scotland Audience Award for his performance as Gregory Finch, aka Gloria. Carlyle also appeared in Bodyguard (2018) and Lip Service (2010).

In 2019 Carlyle starred in Anthony Neilson’s The Tell-Tale Heart at The Royal National Theatre, London. The two have a long working relationship and also worked together on productions of Alice’s Adventures In Wonderland for The Royal Lyceum Theatre in Edinburgh in 2016 and Caledonia for the National Theatre of Scotland/Edinburgh International Festival in 2010. He performed in the award winning To Kill A Mockingbird at Regent’s Park Open Air Theatre and the Barbican. Other notable credits include playing the lead role of The Mayor in the Olivier Award nominated revival of The Government Inspector for Birmingham Rep Theatre, playing Tusenbach in Anya Reiss’ adaptation of Anton Chekhov’s Three Sisters alongside Paul McGann and Holliday Grainger and the award winning The Monster in the Hall by David Greig for Glasgow’s historic Citizen’s Theatre/National Theatre of Scotland (the cast were awarded Best Ensemble at the 2011 Stage Awards).

Early life 
Carlyle was educated at Hamilton Grammar School and Hamilton Youth Theatre. His love of acting began at an early age and was nurtured at youth theatres and by keen teachers who encouraged him to attend drama school. As a child, he worked at the Pavilion Theatre (Glasgow) and King's Theatre (Glasgow) and worked in television from a young age in various STV Pilots.

He trained at Rose Bruford College in Sidcup, graduating in 2010 with a BA (Hons) in Acting. Carlyle trained alongside Hayley Squires, the two remain best friends. Other notable alumni include Gary Oldman, Stephen Graham.

Carlyle previously attended Paul McCartney’s Liverpool Institute of Performing Arts (LIPA) and graduated in 2006 with a Performing Arts Diploma in Acting

Personal life 
Carlyle identifies as gay and cares passionately about combating prejudice towards the LGBTQ+ community. In 2021 and 2022, he hosted the Proud Scotland Awards and also won the Artist/Entertainer Award in 2021.

In Interviews Carlyle often talks about growing up gay in Scotland, like in his interview in 'Out with Suzi Ruffell' and his activity in the LGBTQ+ community. Carlyle worked with Virgin Radio to create a two-part documentary called Getting Out exploring LGBTQ+ youth homelessness. He was interviewed by Graham Norton about the show in June 2022.

Filmography

Awards and nominations

Radio

Theatre

References

External links

David Carlyle Agency Representation & Voice Agency Representation
Performance Masterclass, supported by Channel 4, BAFTA Cymru and BAFTA Scotland
STV's Unmuted: It’s a Sin star David Carlyle’s life in lockdown

Living people
Scottish male television actors
21st-century Scottish male actors
1988 births